The 2016 Omloop van het Hageland was the 12th running of the women's Omloop van het Hageland, a women's bicycle race in Belgium. It was held on 28 February 2016, over a distance of  around Tielt-Winge. It was rated by the UCI as a 1.1 category race.

Results

References

Omloop van het Hageland
Omloop van het Hageland
Omloop van het Hageland